Gooding & Company is a classic car auction company headquartered in Santa Monica, California. Incorporated in 2003, the company holds three of the top ten all-time records for most expensive cars sold in auction. The company also provides private treaty sales, estate planning, and appraisals. Since 2004, Gooding & Company has been the official auction house of the Pebble Beach Concours d'Elegance. Additional auctions are held in Scottsdale, Arizona and Amelia Island.

History 
David Gooding began Gooding & Company in 2003, after serving as managing director of the International Motor Sports department at Christie’s and President of RM Auctions. The company held its inaugural sale at Pebble Beach in 2004. Gooding & Company serves as the official auction house of the Pebble Beach Concours d'Elegance; the weekend’s auctions are pivotal to the global collector car market, revealing trends in pricing and taste. Since its inception, the company has broken numerous world records for cars at auction.

Notable Sales 
 On 5 September 2020 a Bugatti T59, built in 1934, was auctioned for a record 8,5 million pound by Gooding & Company. The car had been used by the Bugatti racing team in 1934-1935 and being driven by René Dreyfus it won the Belgian Grand Prix in 1934. It was later rebuilt as a sportscar by Bugatti and sold to King Leopold III of Belgium
 In August 2018, Gooding & Company set new records for the most expensive prewar car and most expensive American car at their Pebble Beach Auctions. The car to establish these new records was the 1935 Duesenberg SSJ. "Gary Cooper's 1935 Duesenberg SSJ fetches record price at Pebble Beach".
 In May 2010, Gooding & Company handled the private sale of a 1936 Bugatti 57SC Atlantic for more than 30 million dollars, at the time the highest price ever paid for a car.
 Gooding & Company broke several notable auction records at Pebble Beach in 2011, including the most paid for a car at auction with a 1957 Ferrari 250 Testa Rosa prototype. The same event featured the Whittell Coupé, a bespoke 1931 Duesenberg Model J that broke the record for the most expensive American car ever sold at auction.
 Gooding & Company achieved 50 world record sales in 2013, including a 1957 Ferrari 250 GT 14-Louver Berlinetta, a 1997 McLaren F1, and a 1937 Bugatti Type 57SC Atalante.

References

External links 
 Official homepage

American auction houses
American companies established in 2003
Retail companies established in 2003
Automotive companies of the United States